The russet-crowned crake (Rufirallus viridis) is a species of bird in subfamily Rallinae of family Rallidae, the rails, gallinules, and coots. It is found in Bolivia, Brazil, Colombia, Ecuador, the Guianas, Paraguay, Peru, and Venezuela.

Taxonomy and systematics

The russet-crowned crake's taxonomy is unsettled. The International Ornithological Committee (IOC) and BirdLife International's Handbook of the Birds of the World (HBW) place the russet-crowned crake in genus Rufirallus with the chestnut-headed crake (R. castaneiceps). The South American Classification Committee of the American Ornithological Society and the Clements taxonomy place it in genus Anurolimnas with the chestnut-headed crake and black-banded crake (A. fasciatus). The IOC places the latter species in genus Laterallus and HBW places it in genus Porzana.

The worldwide taxonomic systems agree that the species has two subspecies, the nominate R.(or A.) v. viridis and R.(or A.) v. brunnescens.

Description

Males weigh  and females . The sexes are alike. Adults have a black bill, red legs, gray face, and russet crown. The nominate subspecies has brownish olive upperparts and rufous underparts. Juveniles are light brown with a black face and dull pink legs. Adults of R. v. brunnescens are slightly larger than the nominate and have browner upperparts and a paler head and underparts.

Distribution and habitat

The nominate subspecies of russet-crowned crake is widely distributed from far eastern Colombia and southern Venezuela east through the Guianas into Brazil and south and west into eastern Peru, northern and eastern Bolivia, and eastern Paraguay. A separate population is found in Ecuador's Zamora-Chinchipe Province and another in southeastern Brazil between the states of Alagoas and São Paulo. R. v. brunnescens is found in north-central Colombia from the lower Cauca River valley east into the middle Magdalena River valley.

The russet-crowned crake mostly inhabits terrestrial landscapes; in contrast to many other species in its family it is usually not found in marshes. It is found in second-growth sapling thickets, grassy or brushy pastures, overgrown wastelands and roadsides, and gardens at the edges of small communities.

Behavior

Movement

The russet-crowned crake's movements, if any, have not been documented.

Feeding

Almost nothing is known about the russet-crowned crake's foraging behavior or diet. It is known to mostly feed in cover and its diet includes insects and grass seeds.

Breeding

The russet-crowned crake's breeding season spans from January to June. It makes a ball-shaped nest with a side entrance from dead grass. It is typically hidden about  up in a shrub or in other dense vegetation. The clutch size is one to three eggs, but nothing else is known about its breeding biology.

Vocalization

The russet-crowned crake is most vocal in early morning and evening. Its call has been described as a "dry rattling like the sound of a seashell wind chime".

Status

The IUCN has assessed the russet-crowned crake as being of Least Concern. It has a very large range but its population size and trend are not known. No immediate threats have been identified. The nominate subspecies is believed to be common across much of its range but R. v. brunnescens status is not known.

References

russet-crowned crake
Birds of Colombia
Birds of Ecuador
Birds of the Guianas
Birds of the Atlantic Forest
Birds of the Brazilian Amazon
Birds of the Bolivian Amazon
Birds of the Peruvian Amazon
Birds of the Venezuelan Amazon
russet-crowned crake
Taxonomy articles created by Polbot